
 

Russia: Revolution and Civil War, 19171921 is a history of the Russian Revolution and Civil War, written by Antony Beevor and published by Viking Press and Weidenfeld & Nicolson in 2022 in a hardback edition and by Tantor Audio as an audiobook.

Reviews
 Anthony, A. (5 June 2022) Russia: Revolution and Civil War 1917-1921 by Antony Beevor review – butchery of the Bolsheviks. The Guardian.
 Beer, D. (15 June 2022) What Antony Beevor gets wrong about Russia. The New Statesman.
 Kelly, C. (23 May 2022) Russia: Revolution and Civil War by Antony Beevor. The Financial Times.
 Lieven, D. (3 June 2022) Divided they fell: Bolshevik unity enabled victory over the Whites. The Times Literary Supplement.
 Staff, (3 June 2022) Russia: Revolution and Civil War 1917-1921 by Antony Beevor – a ‘grimly magnificent’ book. The Week.

Publication history
 2022 Original Viking hardback publication 
 2022 Original Tantor audiobook publication

See also
 Bibliography of the Russian Revolution and Civil War
 Russia in Flames: War, Revolution, Civil War, 1914–1921
 Russia in Revolution: An Empire in Crisis, 1890 to 1928
 The Russian Revolution: A New History
 A People's Tragedy: The Russian Revolution: 1891-1924

References

External links
 Antony Beevor introduces Russia: Revolution and Civil War 1917-1921

2022 non-fiction books
20th-century history books
History books about the Soviet Union
Viking Press books
Weidenfeld & Nicolson books